Sven Thaulow (24 October 1905 – 17 September 1967) was a Norwegian backstroke sport swimmer.

He was born in Trondheim. He competed at the 1924 Summer Olympics, where he reached the semi finals.

References

1905 births
1967 deaths
Sportspeople from Trondheim
Norwegian male backstroke swimmers
Olympic swimmers of Norway
Swimmers at the 1924 Summer Olympics
20th-century Norwegian people